Grigori Alekseyevich Mikhalyuk (born 9 August 1986) is a Russian professional football coach and a former player. He is the manager of FC Noah.

Coaching career
Mikhalyuk was appointed caretaker manager for Russian Football National League side FC Dynamo Saint Petersburg from April to May 2010.

On 24 June 2021, Mikhalyuk was appointed manager of Armenian Premier League team FC Noah.

External links
 

1986 births
Living people
Russian footballers
Russian football managers
FC Dynamo Saint Petersburg managers
FC Dynamo Saint Petersburg players
Association footballers not categorized by position
Russian expatriate football managers
Expatriate football managers in Armenia